Number 31 Squadron, known as the Goldstars, was a squadron of the Royal Air Force. The Squadron lays claim to being the first military unit to fly in India, where it was based from 1915 to 1947. Throughout the Cold War, No. 31 Squadron was based in West Germany, flying from RAF Laarbruch and RAF Brüggen. Between September 1984 and March 2019, the Goldstars operated the Panavia Tornado GR1/4, initially from RAF Brüggen and after August 2001 from RAF Marham, Norfolk. No. 31 Squadron was disbanded on 14 March 2019 at RAF Marham and will formally reform in October 2023 at RAF Waddington, Lincolnshire, eventually operating the General Atomics Protector RG1 by 2024.

History

First World War and Inter-War period

The Squadron was initially composed of a single 'A' flight and was equipped with the Royal Aircraft Factory B.E.2c. No. 31 Squadron was soon deployed to Risalpur, on the North-West Frontier in the British Raj, where they arrived on 26 December. 'B' and 'C' flights were formed at Gosport in January and April 1916, before joining up with 'A' flight in Risalpur in May. In 1917, the Squadron sent a detachment to Khormaskar, Aden, to fly reconnaissance flights against Ottoman forces. No. 31 Squadron helped form No. 114 Squadron at Lahore when it provided an initial nucleus in September 1917. No. 31 Squadron would remain operating in India throughout the entirety of the First World War, flying the B.E.2c, B.E.2e and the Henri Farman HF.27, primarily supporting the British Army against dissident tribesmen.

The Squadron, along with No. 114 Squadron, took part in operations during the Third Anglo-Afghan War between May and August 1919. No. 31 Squadron carried out raids on Jalalabad on 17, 20 and 24 May in which they lost three aircraft. In June 1919, the Squadron's fleet was standardised with the replacement of the B.E.2s and HF.27s with the Bristol F.2B Fighter. For the next ten years, No. 31 Squadron helped police the Waziristan and Afghanistan regions as well as supporting the British Army in putting down any rebellions.

In February 1931, the Squadron replaced their outdated Bristol F.2Bs with the Westland Wapiti Mk.IIa. The 1935 Quetta earthquake forced the Squadron to relocate to RAF Drigh Road. In June 1937, No. 31 Squadron's laurel wreath and mullet squadron badge was officially approved by King George VI. In April 1939, No. 31 Squadron became a bomber-transport squadron when it inherited Vickers Valentias from No. 216 Squadron and the Bomber Transport Flight. After re-equipping with the Valentia, the Squadron carried out attacks against Mirzali Khan (known as the Faqir of Ipi) during the 1939 Waziristan campaign.

Second World War
For the first 18 months of the Second World War, No. 31 Squadron remained stationed at the North-West Frontier. In April 1941, the Squadron started to be equipped with Douglas DC-2s and began flying support missions to RAF Habbaniya during the 1941 Iraqi coup d'état and the following Anglo-Iraqi War. Returning to India the squadron re-equipped with the Douglas Dakota Mk.I. After the Japanese invasion of Burma, it flew missions between Calcutta and Rangoon dropping supplies for the XIVth Army. After World War II the squadron moved to Java. In 1946, the Squadron was disbanded in Java and reformed at PAF Base Masroor, Mauripur Karachi, at that time in British India.

Cold War (1948–1984)
At the end of 1947 it was again disbanded, but reformed in July 1948 when the Goldstars took over the aircraft and role of the Metropolitan Communications Squadron at RAF Hendon. On 1 March 1955, No. 31 Squadron reverted to its previous identity, and moved to RAF Laarbruch in West Germany with English Electric Canberra PR.7s, becoming a photo reconnaissance unit. The Goldstars received their Squadron Standard, for 25 years of service, on 13 September 1956. Between 8 and 12 September 1958, No. 31 (Photographic Reconnaissance) Squadron participated in Royal Flush III, a reconnaissance competition between 2 ATAF and 4 ATAF at Spangdahlem AFB. The Goldstars flew alongside No. 17 Squadron for 2 ATAF against USAF Douglas RB-66 Destroyers of 4 ATAF for the high altitude part of the competition, with the RAF squadrons being awarded the trophy by General Alfred Gruenther. No. 31 Squadron hosted 3º Stormo of the Italian Air Force when they deployed to RAF Laarbruch in 1967. No. 31 (PR) Squadron disbanded at RAF Laarbruch on 31 March 1971.

In June 1971, crew from No. 31 Squadron began to arrive at RAF Brüggen to help prepare the squadron for its conversion to the McDonnell Douglas Phantom FGR.2. The Goldstars flew their first Phantom sortie on 20 July 1971. The squadron held their reformation parade at RAF Brüggen on 7 October 1971, with the occasion marked by a flypast of four Phantom FGR.2s. No. 31 Squadron were declared combat ready to Supreme Allied Commander Europe (SACEUR) on 1 March 1972, with the unit shortly after deploying to Decimomannu Air Base, Sardinia, for an Armament Practice Camp (APC). On 25 June 1973, the Goldstars lost Phantom XV440 when it crashed into the Wadden Sea, killing pilot Flt. Lt. Hugh Kennedy and WSO Sqn. Ldr. David Hodges.

No. 31 (Designate) Squadron was formed on 1 January 1976 in preparation for conversion to the SEPECAT Jaguar GR.1 strike aircraft, with the new OC Wg. Cdr. Terry Nash arriving at Brüggen on 12 January. The squadron's Jaguar GR.1s were declared operational on 30 June 1976, with the Phantoms being given to both No. 19 Squadron and No. 92 Squadron. In December 1976, No. 31 Squadron was declared combat ready to SACEUR, with conventional weapons and eight British WE.177 nuclear bombs from 1977.

Tornado GR (1984–2019)

No. 31 (Designate) Squadron was formed in September 1984, when the unit took delivery of Panavia Tornado GR.1s at RAF Brüggen. The Goldstars completed their conversion from the Jaguar on 1 November 1984. The squadron's assignment to SACEUR and its war role did not change, although the squadron's allocation of WE.177 weapons increased to eighteen to account for the greater capacity of the Tornado, which could each carry two nuclear weapons, and the ratio of weapons to aircraft at full strength increased to 1.5 : 1. The apparent mismatch between aircraft numbers and WE.177 numbers is explained thus: RAF staff planners expected up to one third attrition in a conventional European high-intensity war, and some aircraft were to be held back in reserve to ensure that if a conflict escalated to use of tactical nuclear weapons, there were sufficient aircraft surviving to deliver the squadron's full stockpile of eighteen nuclear weapons. 

In 1991, No. 31 Squadron was the lead Squadron of the Dhahran Tornado GR1/GR1A  detachment during Operation Granby (Gulf War 1). Under the overall command of Wing Commander Jeremy (Jerry) Witts, the composite squadron was principally comprised from No. 31 Squadron with elements of Nos. IX (B), 14, 17 and 27 Sqns together with a reconnaissance flight formed from elements of Nos. II (AC) and 13 Squadrons. Wg. Cdr. Witts was subsequently awarded the Distinguished Service Order (DSO) for his actions. 

The squadron's nuclear strike role at RAF Bruggen finished in 1994. On 1 January 1995, the squadron was declared operational in the Suppression of Enemy Air Defences (SEAD) role equipped with the Air Launched Anti Radiation Missile ALARM Anti Radiation Missile. While all Tornado GR4s are capable of carrying the ALARM Anti Radiation Missile, only No. 31 Squadron and No. IX (Bomber) Squadrons specialise in the role. In this role they are known as "Pathfinder" squadrons. 

During 1999, the squadron re-equipped with the Tornado GR4. In the same year, No. 31 Squadron participated in Operation Engadine, NATO operations over the Federal Republic of Yugoslavia. For the latter part of this operation the Squadron was temporarily based in Corsica. No. 31 Squadron was the last RAF Squadron to be based at RAF Brüggen in Germany, before returning to the UK to be based at RAF Marham, Norfolk, in August 2001. In 2003, the Goldstars formed the core of the Ali Al Salem Air Combat Wing in Kuwait; an amalgamated Composite squadron of Nos. 31, 9, 617 and II (AC) Squadron crews under the overall command of Wing Commander Paddy Teakle (OC No. 31 Squadron at the time). His actions in command of the Squadron earned him the DSO. From Ali Al Salem Air Base, the squadron operated over Iraq during Operation Resonate South and Operation Telic.

No. 31 Squadron became the lead RAF Tornado GR4 unit on the Brimstone anti-tank missile, accepting the weapon into RAF service at its home base, RAF Marham, on 7 April 2005. 

The squadron completed a tour of Afghanistan on Operation Herrick in 2012 providing fast air support to ground troops in contact. They achieved a 100% sortie success rate, the first Tornado squadron to achieve this milestone on an operational detachment. They received their Operation Herrick service medals from the Air Officer Commanding No. 1 Group Air Vice-Marshal G J Bagwell CBE in September 2012.

In September 2012, they participated in Exercise Shaheen Star, a series of exercises in the United Arab Emirates with the host nation's air force, the French Air Force and the United States Air Force. On 12 August 2014, the Goldstars deployed to RAF Akrotiri, Cyprus, with six Tornados after the UK government authorised reconnaissance missions over Mount Sinjar in Iraq. However, they were shortly relieved in order for the squadron to deploy to Kandahar Airfield, Afghanistan, for their (and the Tornado's) last Operation Herrick deployment – returning to Marham on 11 November 2014. No. 31 Squadron returned to RAF Akrotiri in February 2015 for their first Operation Shader deployment.

On 10 July 2018, to celebrate the RAF's 100th anniversary, nine Tornado GR.4s from No. 31 Squadron and No. IX (B) Squadron participated in a flypast over London. On 13 November 2018, Tornado GR.4 ZD716 was unveiled by the RAF in a special retirement scheme to mark 35 years of Tornado operations. No. 31 Squadron was disbanded, along with No. IX (B) Squadron, on 14 March 2019 at RAF Marham.

Protector RG1 Era
No. 31 Squadron will reform in October 2023 at RAF Waddington, Lincolnshire, equipped with up to sixteen General Atomics MQ-9B, a remotely piloted air system (RPAS), which will be known as the Protector RG Mk 1 in RAF service.

Commanding Officers

 11 Oct 1915 | Capt C Y MacDonald
 27 Mar 1916 | Maj C R S Bradley
 May 1917 | Maj S Hutcheson
 Jul 1917 | Maj R G H Murray MC
 Dec 1918 | Maj E L Millar MBE
 Aug 1919 | Flt Lt D H M Carbery MC DFC
 Jan 1920 | Sqn Ldr A L Neale MC
 Jan 1921 | Sqn Ldr A T Harris AFC; later MRAF Arthur 'Bomber' Harris
 May 1922 | Sqn Ldr A C Maund CBE, DSO; later AVM
 May 1924 | Sqn Ldr A A Walser MC, DFC; later Air Cdre
 Jun 1924 | Sqn Ldr H S Powell MC
 Nov 1925 | Sqn Ldr J O Archer CBE
 Apr 1926 | Sqn Ldr J F Gordon DFC
 Mar 1931 | Sqn Ldr B Ankers DCM
 Feb 1934 | Sqn Ldr C J S Dearlove
 Nov 1934 | Sqn Ldr R M C Macfarlane 
 Oct 1935 | Sqn Ldr J L Airey DFC
 Oct 1936 | Sqn Ldr A V Hammond 
 Oct 1938 | Sqn Ldr F F Wicks DFC
 Nov 1938 | Sqn Ldr C Stephenson
 Apr 1939 | Wg Cdr G J L Read AFC
 Dec 1940 | Wg Cdr W T H Nicholls
 Jun 1941 | Wg Cdr S E Ubee AFC; later AVM
 Sep 1941 | Wg Cdr H P Jenkins DFC
 Jun 1942 | Wg Cdr W H Burbury AFC
 May 1943 | Wg Cdr H A Olivier
 Jan 1944 | Wg Cdr W H Burbury DFC, AFC
 Feb 1945 | Wg Cdr R O Altman DSO, DFC
 Sep 1945 | Wg Cdr Brian R Macnamara DSO; later Air Cdre
 Sep 1946 | Sqn Ldr D W S Evans
 Sep 1946 | Wg Cdr R G F Drinkwater
 Nov 1946 | Wg Cdr J M Cooke DSO, DFC
 Sep 1947 | Wg Cdr C Fothergill
 Jul 1948 | Wg Cdr A R Fane de Salis
 Mar 1950 | Wg Cdr R E Ridgway DSO
 Apr 1952 | Sqn Ldr C G StD Jeffries DFC
 Nov 1952 | Sqn Ldr N Williamson DFC
 Nov 1954 | Sqn Ldr R F V Ellis
 Mar 1955 | Sqn Ldr J C Stead DFC
 Jul 1957 | Sqn Ldr F H P Cattle AFC
 Jan 1958 | Sqn Ldr L A Ferguson
 Feb 1958 | Wg Cdr P A Kennedy DSO, DFC, AFC; later Air Cdre
 Jun 1960 | Wg Cdr C T Dalziel
 Dec 1962 | Wg Cdr P H L Scott AFC; later Air Cdre
 May 1965 | Wg Cdr R G Price; later AVM
 May 1967 | Wg Cdr R L Bennett
 Oct 1967 | Wg Cdr R J Offord; later Air Cdre
 Jun 1971 | Wg Cdr J C Sprent; later Gp Capt
 Aug 1974 | Wg Cdr T H Stonor; later AM Sir Thomas
 Jul 1976 | Wg Cdr T J Nash AFC
 Jul 1978 | Wg Cdr R J Howard AFC
 Dec 1980 | Wg Cdr P Edwards
 May 1983 | Wg Cdr J W A Bolton
 Nov 1984 | Wg Cdr Richard Bogg; later Air Cdre
 Nov 1986 | Wg Cdr P Dunlop AFC
 Aug 1989 | Wg Cdr J J Witts; later Air Cdr
 Feb 1992 | Wg Cdr I S Hall; later Gp Capt
 Aug 1994 | Wg Cdr S L Parkinson; later A/Cdre
 Feb 1997 | Wg Cdr S Randles
 Feb 1998 | Wg Cdr Robert (Robbie) Low
 Sep 2000 | Wg Cdr Iain (Paddy) D Teakle DSO OBE; later A/Cdre
 May 2003 | Wg Cdr Alistair (Al) J Byford MA; later A/Cdre
 Jan 2006 | Wg Cdr Dean (Deano) R Andrew OBE; later A/Cdre
 May 2008 | Wg Cdr Ian (Windy) D Gale MBE; later AM, ACAS
 Oct 2010 | Wg Cdr James (Jim) Mullholland MA BSc
 Oct 2012 | Wg Cdr Richard Yates OBE; later Gp Capt
 Dec 2014 | Wg Cdr James (Freebs) Freeborough OBE; later Gp Capt
 2016 | Wg Cdr Matthew (Matt) Bressani OBE; later Gp Capt

Notable 'Goldstars'
 MRAF Sir Arthur 'Bomber' Harris GCB OBE AFC RAF, former Goldstars Pilot and OC, later CinC Bomber Command.
 ACM Sir Mike Wigston MA CBE RAF former Goldstar Pilot, later Chief of the Air Staff
 AM Greg J Bagwell CB CBE RAF, former Goldstars Tornado Pilot, later Deputy Commander (Operations).
 AM Sir Chris N Harper KBE RAF, former Goldstars QWI Jaguar Pilot
 AM Ian Gale MA MBE RAF former Goldstar Pilot, later Assistant Chief of the Air Staff & Director-General of Joint Force Development, Strategic Command
 Air Cdre Paddy Teakle DSO OBE RAF, former Goldstars Navigator and OC, Commander of the Ali Al Salem Combat Air Wing during Gulf War 2.
 Flt Lt David "Lummie" Lord VC DFC Served most of his career as a Pilot (NCO Aircrew, later Commissioned) on 31 Sqn (1939-1944). Later posted to 271 Sqn where he was posthumously awarded the Victoria Cross for actions during Operation MARKET GARDEN dropping troops into Arnhem.
 Flt Lt John Peters former Goldstars Pilot, separately famous as PoW during Gulf War 1 (while serving on XV Sqn).
 Flt Lt Ian 'Abbo' Abson RAF, former Goldstars Tornado Weapons System Operator (WSO), twice recipient of the Croix de la Valeur Militaire avec Etoile de Bronze (Cross of Military Valour with Bronze Star), while on exchange service with the French Air Force, for Operations in Afghanistan and Libya.

Memorial
As part of the celebrations of its 100th birthday, a No. 31 Squadron memorial was unveiled at the National Arboretum in October 2015.

Affiliations
 HMS Iron Duke (F234)
 3 Regiment Army Air Corps
 Honourable Company of Air Pilots
 31 (Tower Hamlets) Squadron, Air Training Corps (RAF Air Cadets)

See also
List of RAF squadrons

References

External links
 31 Squadron RAF official Web Page
 31 Squadron Association
 

031
Aircraft squadrons of the Royal Air Force in World War II
Transport units and formations of the Royal Air Force
RAF Marham units
Military units and formations established in 1915
031
1915 establishments in the United Kingdom